Bathynataliidae is a family of crustaceans belonging to the order Isopoda.

Genera:
 Bathynatalia Barnard, 1957
 Biremia Bruce, 1985
 Naudea Kensley, 1979

References

Isopoda